Volte-face ( or ) is a total change of position, as in policy or opinion; an about-face.

The expression comes from the  French language.

In the context of politics a volte-face is, in modern English, often referred to as a U-turn or a flip-flop in the UK and the US respectively.

In politics

The royal assent by Charles I in June 1628 to the Petition of Right.
The 1938 decision of British Prime Minister Neville Chamberlain to subsidize Balkan economies to resist German economic supremacy.
The 1990s switch of the Bharatiya Janata Party of India from a support of swadeshi (national) products to the embrace of free market ideas
The switch from populist protectionist policies that fed national movements to free market capitalism, wholly at odds with the election promises of Solidarity in Poland and the African National Congress in South Africa

In diplomacy 
 The Diplomatic Revolution
 The Molotov–Ribbentrop Pact
 The successful manoeuver of Italy in September 1943, when the Italian Army capitulated immediately after the Allied invasion of Sicily. Italy switched sides from one of the aggressor Axis Powers and was allowed to co-operate with the Allies with notable benefits.
 The Soviet switch from supporting Somalia to supporting Ethiopia during the Ogaden War

In business 
 New Coke replaced Coca-Cola's main product with one containing a different formula.  After a public backlash, Coca-Cola reintroduced the original formulation.

Notes

French words and phrases
Italian words and phrases
Portuguese words and phrases
Political terminology